Richard Allen Dysart (March 30, 1929 – April 5, 2015) was an American actor. He is best known for his role as Leland McKenzie in the television series L.A. Law (1986–1994), for which he won a Primetime Emmy Award from four consecutive nominations. In film, he held supporting roles in Being There (1979), The Thing (1982), Mask (1985), Pale Rider (1985) and Wall Street (1987).

Early life
Richard Dysart was born to Alice (née Hennigar) and Douglas Dysart, a podiatrist, near Boston, Massachusetts, on March 30, 1929. Dysart was raised in Skowhegan, Maine and Augusta, Maine. He attended Gould Academy in Bethel, Maine. At the encouragement of his mother, Dysart performed in summer stock at the Lakewood Theater near Skowhegan. He also worked at a local radio station.

He earned both bachelor's (1956) and master's (1981) in speech communication from Emerson College in Boston, although his undergraduate education was interrupted due to his service for four years in the United States Air Force during the Korean War. At Emerson he performed on stage, and he was a class officer and student government vice-president. He was a brother of the Phi Alpha Tau fraternity. He also studied at George Washington University. He returned for his master's degree later, completing it in 1981.

Career
Dysart's acting career began on the stage. He was a founding member of the American Conservatory Theater in San Francisco, California, which began in 1960. He performed on Broadway in All in Good Time (1965), A Place Without Doors (1970-1971), and in the revival of Horace Giddens The Little Foxes (1967–1968), alongside Ann Bancroft,  and That Championship Season (1972–1974). Dysart played the role of Coach in the original Broadway production of Jason Miller's Pulitzer Prize winning play, That Championship Season, alongside Charles Durning in 1973. 

In 1979, Dysart portrayed a good-hearted physician in the film Being There, starring Peter Sellers and Melvyn Douglas. In 1980, he played Abraham Lincoln's Secretary of War Edwin Stanton in the television film The Ordeal of Dr. Mudd. He voiced the kindly miner Uncle Pom in the Disney English-language version of Hayao Miyazaki's 1986 adventure classic Castle in the Sky and the character of Cogliostro on Todd McFarlane's Spawn: The Animated Series, which aired on HBO.

His other movie credits included roles in The Hindenburg, An Enemy of the People, Prophecy, The Thing directed by John Carpenter, Pale Rider directed by Clint Eastwood, and Day One (with L.A. Law co-star Michael Tucker). He appeared in an episode of the 1976 CBS television series Sara.

Honors and awards
Dysart received a Drama Desk Award in 1972 for his role as Coach in That Championship Season.

Dysard was nominated four years in a row for Primetime Emmy Award for Outstanding Supporting Actor in a Drama Series between 1989 to 1992, for his role as Leland McKenzie on L.A. Law, winning just the once in 1992.

Personal life and death
Dysart was married three times. The first two marriages resulted in divorce. He and his third wife, artist Kathryn Jacobi, were married from 1987 until his death. He had no children of his own, but had a stepson from his third wife and two step-grandchildren.

Dysart died at home in Santa Monica, California on April 5, 2015, after a long battle with cancer. He was 86 years old.

Selected filmography

Love with the Proper Stranger (1963) – Accountant (uncredited)
Petulia (1968) – Motel Receptionist
The Lost Man (1969) – Barnes
The Sporting Club (1971) – Spengler
The Hospital (1971) – Dr. Welbeck 
All In The Family (1972) – Russ DeKuyper
The Autobiography of Miss Jane Pittman (1974, TV Movie) – Master Bryant 
The Terminal Man (1974) – Dr. John Ellis
The Crazy World of Julius Vrooder (1974) – Father
The Day of the Locust (1975) – Claude Estee
The Hindenburg (1975) – Captain Ernst Lehman
It Happened One Christmas (1977, TV Movie) – Peter Bailey
An Enemy of the People (1978) – Aslaksen 
Prophecy (1979) – Isely
Meteor (1979) – Secretary of Defense
Being There (1979) – Dr. Robert Allenby
Bitter Harvest (1981) – Dr. Morton Freeman
The Thing (1982) – Dr. Copper
The Falcon and the Snowman (1985) – Dr. Lee
Mask (1985) – Abe
Malice in Wonderland (1985, TV Movie) – Louis B. Mayer
Pale Rider (1985) – Coy LaHood
Warning Sign (1985) – Dr. Nielsen
Blood & Orchids (1986, TV Movie) – Harvey Koster
Castle in the Sky (1986) – Uncle Pom (English version, voice)
The Last Days of Patton (1986, TV Movie) – Gen. Dwight D. Eisenhower
Wall Street (1987) – Cromwell
Day One (1989, TV Movie) – President Harry S. Truman
War and Remembrance (1989, TV Movie) – President Harry S Truman
Back to the Future Part III (1990) – Barbwire salesman
Panther (1995) – J. Edgar Hoover
Truman (1995, TV Movie) – Henry L. Stimson
Todd McFarlane's Spawn (1997) – Cogliostro (voice)
Hard Rain (1998) – Henry Sears
Todd McFarlane's Spawn 2 (1998) – Cogliostro (voice)
Todd McFarlane's Spawn 3: The Ultimate Battle (1999) – Cogliostro (voice)
L.A. Law: The Movie (2002, TV Movie) – Leland McKenzie 
Proteus (2004, Documentary) – The Ancient Mariner (voice)

References

External links

 
 
 Richard Dysart at Internet Off-Broadway Database

1929 births
2015 deaths
Male actors from Massachusetts
American male film actors
American male stage actors
American male television actors
Emerson College alumni
Outstanding Performance by a Supporting Actor in a Drama Series Primetime Emmy Award winners
Male actors from Boston
United States Air Force airmen
United States Air Force personnel of the Korean War
20th-century American male actors
21st-century American male actors
Deaths from cancer in California